The Sumatran hog badger (Arctonyx hoevenii) is a species of mustelid endemic to the island of Sumatra in Indonesia.

Taxonomy 
It was formerly considered a subspecies of the greater hog badger (A. collaris), when it was considered the only species in the genus Arctonyx. However, in 2008, a study proposed splitting A. collaris into 3 species, with one of these being A. hoevenii. This finding was later followed by the American Society of Mammalogists.

Description 
It is the smallest species of Arctonyx, being about the size of a large housecat. It also has sparser fur and a much darker pelage than the other two species in the genus.

Distribution 
The species is endemic to the high-altitude regions of Sumatra, namely the Barisan Range, which extends along the length of the island. Its range extends to the foothills, as low as 700 meters above sea level, up to the very highest point on the island; in 1918, the skull of a Sumatran hog badger was discovered in the alpine zone of Gunung Kerinci. Its core habitat is likely the montane and mossy forests and subalpine meadows between 200 and 2600 meters above sea level. Despite being limited to a limited habitat type on an island, it is thought to be common throughout its range.

References 

Badgers
Mammals of Indonesia
Endemic fauna of Sumatra
Mammals described in 1891